Sebastian Seidl (born 12 July 1990 in Nürtingen) is a German judoka. He competed at the 2016 Summer Olympics in the men's 66 kg event, in which he was eliminated in the second round by Fabio Basile. He also competed in the men's 66 kg event at the 2020 Summer Olympics in Tokyo, Japan.

References

External links

 
 
 
 

1990 births
Living people
German male judoka
Olympic judoka of Germany
Judoka at the 2016 Summer Olympics
Judoka at the 2020 Summer Olympics
Medalists at the 2020 Summer Olympics
Olympic medalists in judo
Olympic bronze medalists for Germany
People from Esslingen (district)
Sportspeople from Stuttgart (region)
Judoka at the 2015 European Games
Judoka at the 2019 European Games
European Games medalists in judo
European Games bronze medalists for Germany
20th-century German people
21st-century German people